Fanling Highway is a part of Route 9 in Hong Kong. It connects the new town of Tai Po and San Tin Highway, passing through Sheung Shui and Fanling on its way. The three lane expressway was constructed between 1983 and 1987.

Alignment
The road succeeds the Tolo Highway at the Lam Kam Interchange where it also interchanges with Tai Wo Service Road West, Lam Kam Road and Tai Po Road. The road then runs to the west of the East Rail line and then passes through the new towns of Fanling and Sheung Shui and diverges from the MTR near Choi Yuen Estate. The road passes through the Kwu Tung area and continues as the San Tin Highway.

Interchanges

{| class="plainrowheaders wikitable"
|+  Fanling Highway
|-
!scope=col|District
!scope=col|Location
!scope=col|km
!scope=col|Interchange name
!scope=col|Exit
!scope=col|Destinations
!scope=col|Notes
|-
|rowspan=4|Tai Po
|rowspan=4|Lam Tsuen Valley
|style="text-align:right"|20.2
|rowspan=2|Lam Kam Road Interchange
|style="text-align:center"|
| Tolo Highway – Tai Po (South), Kowloon
|Southern terminus;  continues
|-
|style="text-align:right"|21.2
|style="text-align:center"|7
|Lam Kam Road / Tai Wo Service Road West – Hong Lok Yuen, Tai Po (North), Shek Kong
|Northbound entrance and southbound exit only
|-
|style="text-align:right"|22.7
|rowspan=2|Fanling Highway Interchange
|rowspan=2 style="background:#ffdddd; text-align:center"|7A
|style="background:#ffdddd;"|Heung Yuen Wai Highway – Sha Tau Kok, Heung Yuen Wai Port
|style="background:#ffdddd;"|Northbound exit and southbound entrance
|-
|style="text-align:right"|
|style="background:#ffdddd;"|Tai Wo Service Road East – Kau Lung Hang, Sha Tau Kok, Heung Yuen Wai Port
|style="background:#ffdddd;"|Northbound entrance and southbound exitLocation of Fanling Highway Bus-bus Interchange
|-
|rowspan=5|North
|rowspan=2|Fanling
|style="text-align:right"|23.9
|rowspan=2|Wo Hop Shek Interchange
|style="background:#ffdddd; text-align:center"|7B
|style="background:#ffdddd;"|Pak Wo Road – Wo Hop Shek, Wah Ming
|style="background:#ffdddd;" rowspan=2|Northbound exit and southbound entrance only
|-
|style="text-align:right"|24.2
|style="background:#ffdddd; text-align:center"|7C
|style="background:#ffdddd;"|Jockey Club Road – Fanling, Sha Tau Kok
|-
|rowspan=2|Sheung Shui
|style="text-align:right"|26.1
|Kai Leng Roundabout
|style="text-align:center"|8
|So Kwun Po Road – Sheung Shui, Fanling
|
|-
|style="text-align:right"|26.9
|Po Shek Wu Interchange
|style="text-align:center"|9
|Po Shek Wu Road – Man Kam To, Sheung ShuiFan Kam Road – Kwu Tung, Shek Kong
|
|-
|Kwu Tung
|style="text-align:right"|30.0
|Pak Shek Au Interchange
|style="background:#ffdddd; text-align:center"|9A
|style="background:#ffdddd;"|Castle Peak Road - Chau Tau / Kwu Tung Road – Pak Shek Au, San Tin
|style="background:#ffdddd;"|Northbound exit and southbound entrance only
|-
|rowspan=3|Yuen Long
|rowspan=3|Lok Ma Chau
|style="text-align:right"|30.8
|rowspan=3|San Tin Interchange
|style="background:#ffdddd; text-align:center"|10B
|style="background:#ffdddd;"|San Sham Road – Shenzhen (Goods vehicles only)
|style="background:#ffdddd;"|Northbound exit only
|-
|style="text-align:right"|31.1
|style="text-align:center"|10
|San Sham Road – Shenzhen (Passenger vehicles)Castle Peak Road - San Tin – San Tin 
|Northbound exit and southbound entrance only
|-
|style="text-align:right"|31.4
|style="text-align:center"|
| San Tin Highway – Yuen Long, Kowloon (via Route 3)
|Northern terminus;  continues

See also
Route 9 (Hong Kong)
Tolo Highway

References

External links
 

Expressways in Hong Kong
Route 9 (Hong Kong)
Tai Po
Fanling